Ralph Chapman (born February 5, 1951) is a former Green member of the Maine House of Representatives. He represented the 133rd district, which covers parts of Hancock County. Originally elected as a Democrat, he later became an independent and finally a Green under the Maine Green Independent Party since September 22, 2017.

Biography
Chapman graduated from Tufts University in 1973. He worked as the principal and technical director of LEO Engineering from 1987 until 1993 and was consultant and owner of Ralph Chapman Consulting from 2000 until 2003. Beginning in 2003, he served as coordinator and instructor of United Technologies Center.

Chapman was first elected to the House in 2010, and reelected in 2012, 2014, and 2016. On May 26, 2017, Chapman, along with fellow representative Denise Harlow, unenrolled from the Democratic Party and became an independent. Both were speculated to have unenrolled due to their opposition to a bill which would allow open-pit mining in the state of Maine. On September 22, 2017, Chapman became a member of the Maine Green Independent Party. He is the first Green Party legislator in Maine since John Eder, who served from 2003 until 2007 and the first Green Party state legislator in the country since Fred Smith of Arkansas, who was elected as a Green but became a Democrat in 2014.

Chapman was term-limited in 2018 and left office in January 2019.

Personal life
Chapman and his wife, Rebecca, have 5 children.

Political positions
For the 2016 United States presidential election, Chapman endorsed Bernie Sanders. He also is an advocate of environmental issues.

Electoral history

References

External links
 
 Legislative website

1951 births
Living people
Maine Democrats
Maine Greens
Maine Independents
Green Party of the United States officeholders
Members of the Maine House of Representatives
People from Brooksville, Maine
Tufts University alumni
21st-century American politicians